Martin Atanasov (born 27 September 1996) is a Bulgarian professional volleyball player. He is a member of the Bulgaria national team. At the professional club level, he plays for Ziraat Bankası Ankara.

Honours

Clubs
 CEV Challenge Cup
  2020/2021 – with Ziraat Bankası Ankara

 National championships
 2015/2016  Bulgarian Championship, with Dobrudja Dobrich
 2017/2018  German SuperCup, with VfB Friedrichshafen
 2017/2018  German Cup, with VfB Friedrichshafen
 2020/2021  Turkish Championship, with Ziraat Bankası Ankara
 2021/2022  Turkish SuperCup, with Ziraat Bankası Ankara
 2021/2022  Turkish Championship, with Ziraat Bankası Ankara
 2022/2023  Turkish SuperCup, with Ziraat Bankası Ankara

References

External links
 
 Player profile at Volleybox.net 

1996 births
Living people
Sportspeople from Sofia
Bulgarian men's volleyball players
Bulgarian expatriate sportspeople in Turkey
Expatriate volleyball players in Turkey
Bulgarian expatriate sportspeople in Germany
Expatriate volleyball players in Germany
Bulgarian expatriate sportspeople in France
Expatriate volleyball players in France
Ziraat Bankası volleyball players
Outside hitters